The Peculiar Sensation of Being Pat Ingoldsby is a 2022 Irish documentary film directed by Seamus Murphy, concerning the life and inspirations of Irish poet and TV presenter Pat Ingoldsby.

Premise
Fondly remembered as an eccentric 1980s Irish TV presenter (Pat's Hat, Pat's Pals and Pat's Chat) and, until recently, as a presence on the Dublin streets (where he would recite and sell his many books of poetry), The Peculiar Sensation of Being Pat Ingoldsby investigates the "idiosyncratic world" of Ingoldsby, interspersed with his poems and candid anecdotes which "bear witness to a visceral relationship with his beloved Dublin, fellow Dubliners and anything that catches his interest". 

Loosely chronological in nature, the documentary begins with the writer's childhood in Malahide, where he suffered with polio and spent a lot of his time on the family sofa listening to BBC Radio and looking out at the other children playing on Malahide Green. The film moves on to his time spent "riding the rails in between jobs" in England before finding employment in a Vauxhall factory in Luton where he would stay for three years. He had the first of several nervous breakdowns in the 1960s and was given his first course of electroshock therapy in 1965. 

Featuring interviews with Ingoldsby's family as well as a select number of additional interviewees, the documentary builds a portrait of Ingoldsby in his own words, complemented by the limited number of "near and dear" interviewees. The documentary is also peppered with Ingoldsby's own "at times stream-of-consciousness" addresses to the camera. The film chronicles Ingoldsby's recent "descent into mental illness" (which factored in his withdrawal from selling his books on the street in 2015), which is twinned with his own sense of being out of place, a feeling that "is ultimately conquered by Gestalt Therapy; that vocal offshoot of psychoanalytic practice". Until the documentary, Ingoldsby had not been interviewed on camera since 1993's Between Stations. Ingoldsby ultimately credits Gestalt therapy with breaking his cycle of psychiatric care and helping him to become a "healthy, well-rounded, balanced person."

Release
The Peculiar Sensation of Being Pat Ingoldsby was released in Ireland in November 2022, and was screened as part of the Irish Film Institute's Documentary Festival 2022.

Reception
The Irish Film Institute described the film as "a moving and entertaining portrait of a maverick who has faced personal challenges with apparent equanimity finding balm in his writing which infuses the banality of the everyday with surreal humour".

References

External links
 
 

2022 films
2022 documentary films
Documentary films about poets
Documentary films about mental health
Documentary films about mental disorders
Films shot in Dublin (city)
Irish documentary films
Films shot in Ireland
Pat Ingoldsby
Writers from Dublin (city)
Pat Ingoldsby
2020s English-language films
Documentary films about England
Documentary films about writers
Documentary films about religion
English-language Irish films